Murderer is a 1975 comedy/thriller play written by Anthony Shaffer. Set in Dorset, England, the play tells the story of Norman Bartholomew, a painter who is obsessed with famous murderers of the past. He takes great pleasure in recreating their crimes, and hopes to one day join their ranks by performing a murder of his own.

Cast of Characters
Norman Cresswell Bartholomew
Sergeant Stenning
Millie Sykes
Elizabeth Bartholomew

1975 plays
British plays
Comedy thriller plays